Yeşim Ağaoğlu (born January 21, 1966) is a Turkish multidisciplinary artist and a poet who works with various mediums, especially concentrating on installation, photography and video. Her family comes from the city of Shusha in the Karabagh region of Azerbaijan. The most important thing for her in art is being interactive. She works on poetry (language) and art relationships, gender and feminism issues, architectural elements and political subjects. Since 1995 Agaoglu has produced nine poetry books that have made her famous as a female poet in the literature scene of Turkey.

Life and career 
Ağaoğlu was born in Istanbul, Turkey on January 21, 1966. She studied at the University Of Istanbul, Department Of Archaeology and Art History. She has a master of arts degree from the University Of Istanbul, Faculty Of Communications, Department of Radio-TV-Cinema. She attended part-time film lessons using a Super 8 mm film camera at the New York School of Visual Arts; these lessons has resulted in a short film called Loneliness, Machines And Meditation.

Her poems have been published in literary journals since the age of 18. She has seven poetry books that have been published in Turkey and two poetry books published in Azerbaijan. Ağaoğlu's poems have been translated into many languages, such as Azeri, Russian, English, Italian, and Spanish. She is a member of the International PEN and also a board member of BESAM (Creators of Scientific and Literary Works Association). Since 2012 she has been an Honored Member of PEN Union of Azerbaijani Writers.

Yeşim Ağaoğlu has been continuing contemporary art activities combining different disciplines since 1996. She has had four solo exhibitions in Azerbaijan, Georgia, Bosnia and Herzegovina and Norway. Ağaoğlu has participated in a number of exhibitions in countries like Germany, France, Poland, the Netherlands, Italy, Bulgaria, Uzbekistan, Korea, Brasil, Mongolia, and the USA. Since 2012 she has been an Honored Member of Union of Artists of Azerbaijan.

Artwork 
Ağaoğlu has concentrated on art making with performance, visual material and objects. At the beginning her poems, written on yellow paper with a conventional typewriter, occupied the center of these works. The yellow pages are a basic material and modest element of communication with the people, but when they are arranged in huge geometrical heaps in the exhibition spaces they also become a Fluxus installation. Her presence in the exhibition space is considered as performance, even if she does not make a performance in the sense that she is directly involved in the process of the artwork, but her continuous blending into the viewers' attendance gives the impression of a performance. Her approach to art-making is minimalist and modest. Avoiding popularity and sophistication she describes her works as "technically simple but conceptually rich."

As a photographer, Ağaoğlu journeys into the city's simple and elaborate images, focusing on hybrid architecture, human diversity, gender differentiations and well-hidden ideological symbols and manifestations. 
Being highly sensitive to the socio-political environment of her region, it is a necessity for her to convey her messages through particular strategies in art making; and, every time she invents new ones. She is decidedly doing well in fulfilling the prerequisites of approaching the distant public of contemporary art.

Selected exhibitions and professional experience

Solo exhibitions 
 2012 — Center of Contemporary Art, Baku, Azerbaijan
 2010 — Tou Scene Art Centre, Stavanger, Norway
 2009 — Turkish Culture Center, Sarajevo, Bosnia and Herzegovina.
 2008 — Caucasian House, Tbilisi, Georgia
 2008 — Yeni Gallery, Baku, Azerbaijan.

Group exhibitions 
 2002 — "Sheshow", ATA Center for Contemporary Art, Sofia, Bulgaria.
 2004 — "Turkish Delight", Video Art Show, Rio Modern Art Museum, Brazil.
 2004 — "Field of Vision", Gallery Lab, New York, USA.
 2005 — Tashkent Biennale, Uzbekistan.
 2006 — "Caravansarai" International Festival, Heartgallery, Paris, France.
 2006 — "Rejection Episodes Exhibition", Istanbul Express Festival in Vooruit Culture and Art Center Gent, Belgium.
 2007 — 3d International Biennial of Contemporary Art "Aluminium", Shirvanshakh's Palace, Baku, Azerbaijan
 2008 — "Steps of Time" Modern and Contemporary Azerbaijan Art, Dresden State Museum of Art, Germany
 2008 — "Artisterium" 1st Tbilisi International Contemporary Art Exhibition and Art Events, Karvasla Tbilisi History Museum, Georgia
 2008 — "Immagino" Workshop, Genova, Italy.
 2008 — "7848 km Korean-Turkish Exchange Exhibition",Inchon, Korea.
 2008 — "Reasonable", Hafriyat, Istanbul, Turkey.
 2009 — "Dirty Story", Group exhibition, BM Suma Contemporary Art Centre, Istanbul, Turkey.
 2009 — "Istanbul next wave", Akademie der Künste, Berlin, Germany.
 2009 — "Istanbul off Independent Art Space Exhibition&Forum", Bethanien, Berlin, Germany.
 2010 — MONGOLIA 360' Land Art Biennale, Mongolian National Modern Art Gallery, Ulaanbaatar
 2010 — "USSR-remix", group exhibition, Art Centre Tou Scene, Stavanger, Norway
 2010 — "OPENLY" International Women Video art exhibition  in frame of "Istanbul 2010- Capital of Culture of Europe", Antrepo5, Sanat Limani, Istanbul, Turkey
 2011 — "Collective Privacy", C.A.M Galery, Istanbul, Turkey.
 2011 — Turkish Human Rights Association 20th Year exhibition, Tutun Deposu, Istanbul, Turkey
 2011 — Artist in Residency, Almeria, Spain
 2012 — Critical Art Ensemble, Documenta 13, Kassel, Germany
 2012 — Fictions and Dissentions, 3rd Canakkale Biennale, Turkey
 2012 — Out of Place, Corpo 6 Gallery, Berlin, Germany
 2013 — Discarted, Hayaka Art gallery, Istanbul, Turkey
 2013 — Black Sea Calling, Hilger BROT Kunsthalle, Vienna, Austria
 2014 — The Warnth of a Patchwork Quilt, 8th Alanica, NCCA, Vladikavkaz, Ossetia, Russia
 2014 — "Re-Museum" International Contemporary Art Exhibition, National Gallery, Tbilisi, Georgia
 2014 — "Deprivation", Gallery Arsenal, Bialystok, Poland
 2014 — "Small is Beautiful", Kuad Gallery, Istanbul, Turkey

Poetry 

Since 1995, Yeşim Agaoğlu has produced nine poetry books. The emphasis in her poems is on exploration of the most obscure dreams, desires, and intentions of the soul and the unpredictable relations between individuals; however, in between the layers of poetic descriptions she allows the reader to pass through a socio-political terrain that reflects her critical approach to the order of things. She discloses this complexity in a surrealist mode intertwined with an exhilarating openness of subject and form. Her imaginative qualities also owe much to her education in archeology and cinema.

Poetry books 
 "yanlışlar şehrinde randevu" ("rendezvous in the mistaken city" (October 1995) Liman publications, İstanbul.
 "hırsızlama aşklar, gri yalnızlıklar" ("love stolen, loneliness grey" (November 1996)) Liman publications, İstanbul.
 "portakal tek meyve değildir" ("orange is not the only fruit " (March 1997)) Liman publications, İstanbul.
 "başka gezegenin insanları" ("people of another planet" (March 1997)) Liman publications, İstanbul.
 "new york blues" ("new york blues" (March 1997))Liman publications, İstanbul.
 "özlem şehirleri" ("missing cities" (2006)) Free Writers Society publications, Baku, Azerbaijan.
 "eflatun sır" ("purple secret" (March 2007)) Yitik Ülke publications, Istanbul.
 "güllerin ağırlığı" ("heaviness of the roses" ( 2007)) By the support of Azerbaijan and Turkish Ministry of Culture, published in Russian and Turkish, Baku, Azerbaijan
 "sana şiir yazmasam olur mu" ("you dont mind if i dont write poems to you"(2011) Yitik Ülke publications, Istanbul)

Festivals and literature events 

 1998 — Residency in International Writers and Translators House, Rodos Island, Greece
 1998 — Darul Ihsan University, Chief guest in residency, World 1st Poetry Day celebration, Dhaka, Bangladesh
 1999 — 6th International Mediterranean Poets Meeting, Bodrum (Halicarnassus), Turkey
 2010 — Solo Poetry Reading, Archaeological Museum, Stavanger, Norway
 2010 — 49th Struga International Poetry Festival, Macedonia
 2011 — Krytia International Poetry Festival,  Nagpur, India
 2011 — 10th Sarajevo International Poetry Festival
 2011 — 3d Sadho International Poetry Film Festival, New Delhi, India
 2012 — "Guest poet and poetry reading for connection of poetry and theater talk",  Turkish PEN Writers' Club event, Ahmet Hamdi Tanpınar Literature Museum, Istanbul, Turkey.
 2012 — "Special guest of poetry talk, poetry reading and receiving Azerbaycan PEN Writes' Club Honorary Membership", Azerbaijan Writers Union, Baku, Azerbaijan.
 2012 — "Spring poetry rain", 26 May, Cyprus.
 2012 — "Poetry Book Signing Day", TUYAP Book Fair, Istanbul.
 2012 — "15 th of November Writers In The Banishment Day",Turkey PEN international event participant, (With participation of International PEN Club President), Istanbul.
 2013 — "Turkey PEN Club World Poetry Day", organised by French Cultural Center, Istanbul.
 2013 — "5th International Azerbaijan Poet's day" (getting prize, by the honour of Azerbaijani poet Mikail Müşvik), Baku, Azerbaijan.
 2013 — "4th Ordu International Literature Festival" (Literature and Cinema Relations), Ordu, Turkey
 2015 — "Poetica I", Festival für Weltliteratur 26.–31.1.2015 – Köln

References and notes

External links 
 Yeşim Ağaoğlu's art blog
 Yeşim Ağaoğlu's poetry blog
 Yeşim Ağaoğlu's profile on Saatchi
 Yeşim Ağaoğlu's profile on artist.de

1966 births
Living people
20th-century Turkish poets
21st-century Turkish poets
Artists from Istanbul
Turkish video artists
Women video artists
Turkish photographers
Turkish women photographers
Women installation artists
Turkish women poets
20th-century Turkish women writers
20th-century Turkish writers
21st-century Turkish women writers
20th-century Turkish women artists
21st-century Turkish women artists
20th-century women photographers
21st-century women photographers